Buttermilk Falls is a waterfall located on Limestone Creek east-northeast of Clockville, New York and south of Wampsville, New York.

References

Waterfalls of New York (state)
Landforms of Madison County, New York
Tourist attractions in Madison County, New York